Jean Rebeyrol (14 October 1903 – 25 August 1975) was a French swimmer. He competed in the men's 1500 metre freestyle event at the 1924 Summer Olympics.

References

External links
 

1903 births
1975 deaths
French male freestyle swimmers
Olympic swimmers of France
Swimmers at the 1924 Summer Olympics
Sportspeople from Bordeaux